Foundation may refer to:
 Foundation (nonprofit), a type of charitable organization
 Foundation (United States law), a type of charitable organization in the U.S.
 Private foundation, a charitable organization that, while serving a good cause, might not qualify as a public charity by government standards
 Foundation (cosmetics), a multi-coloured makeup applied to the face 
 Foundation (evidence), a legal term
 Foundation (engineering), the element of a structure which connects it to the ground, and transfers loads from the structure to the ground

Arts, entertainment, and media

Film and TV
 The Foundation, a film about 1960s-1970s Aboriginal history in Sydney, featuring Gary Foley
 Foundation (TV series), an Apple TV+ series adapted from Isaac Asimov's novels
 "The Foundation" (Seinfeld), an episode
 The Foundation (1984 TV series), a Hong Kong series
 The Foundation (Canadian TV series), a 2009–2010 Canadian sitcom

Games
 Foundation, an Amiga video game
 Foundation, a 2019 simulation video game by Polymorph Games
 The Foundation, a character in 2017 game Fortnite Battle Royale

Literature 
 Foundation series, a series of science fiction books by Isaac Asimov
 Foundation (Asimov novel), the first book in Asimov's series, published in 1951
 Foundation (b-boy book), by Joseph G. Schloss
 Foundation (Lackey novel), a 2008 fantasy novel by Mercedes Lackey

Music 
 The Foundations, a British soul group

Albums
 Foundation (Brand Nubian album)
 Foundation (Breakage album)
 Foundation (Doc Watson album)
 Foundation (Magnum album)
 Foundation (M.O.P. album)
 Foundation, a 1997 compilation album by Die Krupps
 The Foundation (Geto Boys album)
 The Foundation (Pep Love album), 2005
 The Foundation (Zac Brown Band album)
The Foundations (album), by 4 Corners

Songs
 "Foundation", a 1998 song by Brand Nubian from the eponymous album Foundation
 "Foundation", a 2009 song by M.O.P. from the eponymous album Foundation
 "Foundation", a 2010 song by Breakage from the eponymous album Foundation
 "Foundation", a 2015 song by Years & Years from Communion
 "Foundations" (song), by Kate Nash
 "The Foundation" (song), by Xzibit

Other uses in arts, entertainment, and media
 Foundation – The International Review of Science Fiction, a literary journal
 The Foundation Trilogy (BBC Radio), a radio adaption of Asimov's series
 The SCP Foundation, a fictional organization that is often referred to in-universe as "The Foundation"

Education 
 Foundation degree, a British academic qualification
 Foundation school, a type of school in England and Wales
 Foundation Stage, a stage of education for children aged 3 to 5 in England
 University Foundation Programme, a British university entrance course

Science and technology 
 Foundation (framework), a free collection of tools for creating websites and web applications by ZURB
 Foundation Fieldbus, a communications system
 Foundation Kit, an Apple API

Companies 

 Foundation Medicine, a genomic profiling company

See also